James Epherium Avrea (July 6, 1920 – June 26, 1987) was an American professional baseball player. The right-handed pitcher appeared in two Major League Baseball games for the Cincinnati Reds during the 1950 season. Avrea was born in Cleburne, Texas, and attended W. H. Adamson High School in Dallas.

Avrea's professional career lasted for six total seasons (1940; 1947–1951). His two appearances for the Reds came as a relief pitcher on April 22 and May 6, 1950, both Cincinnati defeats. In his debut game, Avrea entered the game with the Reds down 9–1 in the fourth inning; he held the Pittsburgh Pirates off the scoresheet for 2 innings pitched before exiting for a pinch hitter. In his second and final appearance, he again entered a lopsided game, with Cincinnati trailing the Boston Braves 11–1. He gave up two runs in 2 innings and left with the Reds still trailing 13–9; they dropped that game 15–11.

In his two games, Avrea notched two strikeouts and allowed six hits, three bases on balls and two runs in 5 innings pitched, with a 3.38 earned run average. He died in Dallas at age 66.

References

External links

Baseball-Almanac page

1920 births
1987 deaths
Baseball players from Dallas
Cincinnati Reds players
Cordele Bees players
Jacksonville Tars players
Major League Baseball pitchers
People from Cleburne, Texas
Syracuse Chiefs players
Tulsa Oilers (baseball) players
Tyler Trojans players